Alicia Jayne Coutts,  (born 14 September 1987) is an Australian competitive  medley, butterfly and freestyle swimmer. She represented Australia at the 2008 Summer Olympics, 2012 Summer Olympics and the 2010 Commonwealth Games (New Delhi). She was a Swimming Australia National Training Centre scholarship holder and was coached by John Fowlie. Her haul of five medals at the 2012 Summer Olympics matches fellow Australians Ian Thorpe and Shane Gould in one single Olympics, and trails only Emma McKeon’s seven.

Early years
Coutts was born in Brisbane, Queensland.  She attended St Matthews Primary School and Chisholm Catholic College.

Career

2008 Olympics
Coutts competed at the 2008 Summer Olympics where she ended up fifth in the 200-metre individual medley.

2010 Commonwealth Games and Pan Pacs
At the Pan Pacs, she took two relay silver medals and bronze in the 100 m butterfly.

At the 2010 Commonwealth Games, she won the 100-metre butterfly, 100-metre freestyle, 200-metre individual medley, as well as contributing to the 4×100-metre freestyle relay and 4×100-metre medley relay, bringing her total haul to 5 gold medals. She carried the Australian flag at the Commonwealth Games closing ceremony.  She was named the Telstra Australian Swimmer of the Year for 2010.

At the 2011 Australian Championships which doubled as the World Championship Trials, seeking to pick up her first national title. On night two, she doubled up, taking the 100-metre butterfly by a clear margin, as well as the 200-metre individual medley, beating Olympic champion Stephanie Rice by approximately an arm's length. She took 6th place in the 200-metre freestyle. On night six, she took gold in the 100-metre freestyle, winning by a clear margin over Yolane Kukla. In June, she took 3 gold at the Barcelona leg of the Mare Nostrum Series, downing the meet record of the 100-metre butterfly as well as the 200-metre individual medley in a personal best time.

2011 World championships and Olympic Trials
At the 2011 World Championships on night two, Coutts took silver medals in the 100-metre butterfly and 200-metre individual medley. She swam the butterfly leg of the 4×100-metre medley relay, capturing a bronze medal.

At the 2012 Olympic Trials, she won the 100-metre butterfly holding off Jessicah Schipper down the stretch and stopping Libby Trickett's attempt to defend her Olympic title in that event. She took silver in the 200-metre medley, booking another individual spot. She later placed in the top 6 in the 100-metre freestyle, gaining a spot on the 4×100-metre freestyle relay. On the final night she collected silver in the 4×100-metre medley relay.

2012 Olympics
On night one, she collected gold in the 4×100-metre freestyle relay with Cate Campbell, Brittany Elmslie and Melanie Schlanger setting a new Olympic record in the process. On night two, she collected a bronze in the 100-metre butterfly, she became the 8th fastest of all time. Night 4 she got a silver in the 200-metre individual medley becoming the 5th fastest of all time. On night 5, she anchored the 4×200-metre freestyle relay team to silver, recording a 200-metre split time of 1:56.12, 1.6 seconds quicker than her official personal best. On the final night, she collected a silver in the 4×100-metre medley relay, bringing her medal total to 5 in a single Olympic Games.

At the 2013 Australian Championships (which doubled as the qualifiers for 2013 World Aquatics Championships), Coutts won gold the 50 and 100-metre butterfly and the 200-metre individual medley, silver in the 50-metre backstroke and bronze in the 50-metre breastroke and 100-metre freestyle.

2013 World Championships
At the World Championships, she collected silver medals in the 100-metre butterfly, 200-metre medley, 4x100-metre freestyle relay, 4×200-metre freestyle relay, 4×100-metre medley relay.

2016 Olympics
At the 2016 Summer Olympics, Coutts finished fifth in the final of the 200 m individual medley. In October 2016, she announced her retirement.

Career best times
Coutts holds one Olympic record in the 4×100-metre freestyle relay, the Commonwealth records in the short-course 100-metre butterfly, 100-metre and 200-metre individual medley, and two Commonwealth Games records and is the fastest Australian in textile in the 200-metre individual medley and 100-metre butterfly.

Recognition
In 2012, she won the Australian Institute of Sport Athlete of the Year Award with sailor Tom Slingsby.

See also
 List of Olympic medalists in swimming (women)
 List of World Aquatics Championships medalists in swimming (women)
 List of Commonwealth Games medallists in swimming (women)
 List of Australian records in swimming
 List of Commonwealth records in swimming

References

External links 

 
 
 
 
 
 
 
 
 
 

1987 births
Living people
Australian Institute of Sport swimmers
Commonwealth Games gold medallists for Australia
Australian female butterfly swimmers
Australian female freestyle swimmers
Australian female medley swimmers
Medalists at the 2012 Summer Olympics
Olympic bronze medalists for Australia
Olympic gold medalists for Australia
Olympic bronze medalists in swimming
Olympic silver medalists for Australia
Olympic swimmers of Australia
Recipients of the Medal of the Order of Australia
Sportswomen from Queensland
Swimmers at the 2008 Summer Olympics
Swimmers at the 2010 Commonwealth Games
Swimmers at the 2012 Summer Olympics
Swimmers at the 2014 Commonwealth Games
World Aquatics Championships medalists in swimming
Swimmers from Brisbane
Swimmers at the 2016 Summer Olympics
Olympic gold medalists in swimming
Olympic silver medalists in swimming
Commonwealth Games medallists in swimming
People from Redland City
Medallists at the 2010 Commonwealth Games
Medallists at the 2014 Commonwealth Games
21st-century Australian women